The Tilles Foundation is a St. Louis based charity fund for orphans, dependent mothers, and poor college students.  The foundation was originally named the Rosalie Tilles Nonsectarian Charity Fund.

Established in 1926, the fund was a Christmas gift from C. A. Tilles to the City of St. Louis and its people.

History 
The foundation was established in 1926.

References

Bibliography 

"C. Andrew Tilles Dies; Was Racetrack Owner". Auburn Maine, The Lewiston Daily Sun. November 23, 1951. Retrieved on 16 January 2014.
"Gives Million to the Poor" Cape Girardeau, Southeast Missourian. December 22, 1926. Retrieved on 21 January 2014.

External links 
Tilles Foundation Official Website

Foundations based in the United States